McTay Marine was a shipbuilder in Bromborough, Merseyside from 1974 to 2016.

History
McTay Engineering had been set up in 1963 by James McBurney and Jim Taylor. McTay Engineering specialised in the construction of storage tanks and associated plant. Taylor and McBurney had, prior to the formation of McTay Engineering been employed by another shipbuilding company, and in 1973 they began to consider the building of small workboats and launches, which led to the formation of the subsidiary McTay Marine Ltd in 1974. The group was acquired by Mowlem in the late 1970s and by Daniel Contractors of Warrington in 2006.

McTay Marine Ltd was founded as a subsidiary of McTay Engineering. Over the following 39 years the company went on to build over 120 vessels. Among them is the building of the first beam trawler in the United Kingdom, which was also the largest built up till that time. The first tug built by the company was the United Kingdom's first "Voith" tug, and the second built was the UK's first "Azimuth" fitted tug to be built. The McTay built tug Trafalgar became the world's most powerful "Voith" tug on its completion and delivery in 1998.

The company went into liquidation in 2015 and the shipyard was taken over by Carmet Marine Ltd.

Facilities

McTay Marine Limited was involved in the design, build and delivery of specialised ships and workboats since 1974. Located at its 6-acre site at Bromborough on the banks of the River Mersey this longstanding icon in small ship construction built over 120 complex vessels over a period spanning well over thirty-years. The shipyard is now owned by Carmet Marine Ltd.

The shipyard has a build hall and engineering workshop; build hall is 80 metres in length by 25 metres in height with 10.4-metre-high doors opening directly onto the slipway. Engineering shop is 50 metres in length and is directly adjacent. Overhead cranage is available in the form of one 25- and two 5-ton travelling cranes; engineering shop has similar capacities to hand.

The slipway is again fully equipped and has a maximum 300-tonne capacity, and can be used for both vessel repairs and also launch activities.

Mobile cranes, elevating work platforms and forklifts are also available to support both build and repair activities.

Ships built
Shannon is a harbour and coastal tug, originally built in 1981 as the Eldergarth. The tug is noteworthy as the first British-built Azimuthing Stern Drive tug. Shannon has been acquired by Emu Limited and re-equipped in Southampton with a suite of specialist winches and a stern mounted 'A' frame.

During heavy rain, London's sewage storm pipes overflow into the River Thames, sending dissolved oxygen levels plummeting and threatening the species it supports. Two dedicated McTay vessels, oxygenation barges Thames Bubbler and Thames Vitality are used to replenish oxygen levels, as part of an ongoing battle to clean up the river, which now supports 115 species of fish and hundreds more invertebrates, plants and birds.

The £6.5M contract, to build the superstructure and assemble CRV Leonardo for NATO, safeguarded the jobs of McTay's 60-strong workforce. The Coastal Research Vessel now monitors submarine activity in the Mediterranean.

References

Defunct shipbuilding companies of England
Companies based in Merseyside